Deepak Tiwari is an Indian journalist, serving as the Hindi editor of Global Investigative Journalism Network (GIJN) and former Vice Chancellor of Makhanalal Chaturvedi National University of Journalism MCU, Bhopal. He was founder managing editor of JoshHosh Media, Bhopal.

Life

In the field of journalism since 1991, Tiwari had worked for Press Trust of India PTI, New Delhi, Free Press, Central Chronicle and All India Radio. As a journalist he has reported news-stories from the states of Madhya Pradesh, Chhattisgarh, Uttar Pradesh, Jharkhand, Orissa, Assam, Mizoram, Rajasthan, Andhra Pradesh, Gujarat and Maharashtra. He has also covered stories from United Kingdom, Malaysia, Singapore and Thailand outside India.

His story on the abuse of dalit women in Panchayati Raj fetched him the Sarojini Naidu Prize for best reporting on women in Panchayati Raj. The award carries a cash prize of Rs Two Lakh and is given every year to development journalists. Another story in 2002 on missing tribal girls from central India got him United Nation Development Program (UNDP) award. Tiwari is also a recipient of Makhanlal Chaturvedi Puruskar, Jagat Pathak Patrakarita Puruskar, Prashant Samman and other awards.

With The Week magazine he had written number of investigative stories on human rights and development issues. He is known as a progressive journalist writing on marginalised sections of society. A feature film Devaki, made in 2004, was based on his story of women being auctioned in tribal society.

Apart from being a political commentator on various media forums including television, Tiwari had worked as media consultant to a projects of European Commission, DFID of United Kingdom and UNICEF.

His book on political history of Madhya Pradesh titled Rajneetinama Madhya Pradesh Rajnetaon Ke Kisse (1956-2003) published in December 2013 was termed as the seminal work on political history of Madhya Pradesh by The Hindu. His second book Rajnitinama Madhya Pradesh - Bhajapa Yug (2003-2018) forms part of two volumes on political history of MP. Only books on political history of state since 1956.

He has traveled to England, Scotland, Germany, Singapore, Malaysia, Thailand, Spain, France, Sri Lanka and United Arab Emirates.

References

https://www.jansatta.com/education/madhya-pradesh-congress-government-appointed-senior-journalist-deepak-tiwari-as-vc-of-makhanlal-chaturvedi-national-journalism-and-communication-university/924602/

https://www.business-standard.com/article/pti-stories/senior-journalist-deepak-tiwari-appointed-vc-of-mp-varsity-119022400471_1.html
https://www.bhaskar.com/mp/bhopal/news/mp-news-deepak-tiwari-will-be-the-new-vice-chancellor-of-journalism-university-042634-3979743.html
https://www.dailypioneer.com/2020/state-editions/appointed-during-nath-govt--mcu-university--v-c-now-calls-it-quits.html

https://hindi.news18.com/news/madhya-pradesh/bhopal-mcu-vice-chancellor-issued-notice-to-more-than-24-professors-mprd-nodark-2788666.html

External links
Indiatogether.org
https://www.business-standard.com/article/pti-stories/senior-journalist-deepak-tiwari-appointed-vc-of-mp-varsity-119022400471_1.html
https://www.bhaskar.com/mp/bhopal/news/mp-news-deepak-tiwari-will-be-the-new-vice-chancellor-of-journalism-university-042634-3979743.html
https://www.youtube.com/watch?v=mzpgC2NJSiE
https://www.amarujala.com/madhya-pradesh/journalist-deepak-tiwari-is-a-new-vc-of-makhanlal-chaturvedi-national-university-of-journalism
https://hindi.news18.com/news/madhya-pradesh/bhopal-mcu-vice-chancellor-issued-notice-to-more-than-24-professors-mprd-nodark-2788666.html

https://www.dailypioneer.com/2020/state-editions/appointed-during-nath-govt--mcu-university--v-c-now-calls-it-quits.html

Journalists from Madhya Pradesh
Living people
Writers from Bhopal
Year of birth missing (living people)